Genencor is a biotechnology company based in Palo Alto, CA and a subsidiary of IFF. Genencor is a producer of Industrial enzymes and low-priced bulk protein. The name Genencor originates with Genencor, Inc., the original joint venture between Genentech and Corning Incorporated, which was founded in 1982.  It is considered to have pioneered the field of industrial biotechnology, as distinct from traditional applications of biotechnology to health care and agriculture.

In 2005 Genencor was acquired by Danisco.

In 2008 Genencor entered a joint venture with DuPont, called DuPont Danisco Cellulosic Ethanol LLC, to develop and commercialize low cost technology for the production of cellulosic ethanol. In 2008, Genencor and Goodyear announced they were working to develop BioIsoprene.

In 2011, Dupont acquired Danisco for $6.3 billion.

In 2021, portions of Dupont including the Genencor division were acquired by International Flavors & Fragrances.

Awards
Genencor achieved the following awards:
Named No. 2 Best Medium-Sized Company to Work for in America by the Great Place to Work® Institute, Inc. (2004)
Named No. 1 Best Medium-Sized Company to Work for in America by the Great Place to Work® Institute, Inc. (2005)
Named No. 1 Best Place to Work in the Bay Area by the San Francisco Chronicle (2005)
Named No. 11 Best Medium-Sized Company to Work for in America by the Great Place to Work® Institute, Inc. (2011)

See also
Environmental biotechnology
Agricultural biotechnology

References

Biotechnology companies of the United States
Biotechnology companies established in 1982
1982 establishments in California
Companies based in Rochester, New York